Shoni Schimmel (born May 4, 1992) is an American professional basketball player. She is a former All-American college player at the University of Louisville and was selected with the eighth overall pick in the first round  of the 2014 draft by the Atlanta Dream.

Early life and high school
Schimmel, a 5'9" shooting guard, first received attention as a high school player in Oregon. Raised on the Confederated Tribes of the Umatilla Indian Reservation in Mission, Oregon, she was the subject of a documentary by filmmaker Jonathan Hock called Off the Rez, which chronicled her journey to earn an NCAA scholarship with her basketball ability. She transferred from Hermiston High School in eastern Oregon to the larger Franklin High School in Portland, Oregon to increase her chances of being recruited to a Division I school.  After her senior year at Franklin, Schimmel was named a first team All-American by Parade magazine.

Schimmel was selected to the 2010 Women's Basketball Coaches Association High School Coaches' All-America Team. The top twenty high school players in the country are named as WBCA All-Americans, and eligible to play in the all-star game. She participated in the 2010 WBCA High School All-America Game, scoring six points.

College career
Schimmel chose Louisville for college and became a four-year starter for the Cardinals. As a junior in 2012–13, Schimmel led the team to the championship game of the 2013 Tournament. In her senior season, Schimmel averaged 17.1 points per game to lead the team in scoring and was named an All-American by the USBWA and Associated Press.

For her career, she finished second on the Louisville career scoring list, finishing with 2,174 points.

College statistics
Source

USA Basketball

Schimmel was selected to be a member of the team representing the US at the 2013 World University Games held in Kazan, Russia. The team, coached by Sherri Coale, won the opening four games easily, scoring in triple digits in each game, and winning by 30 or more points in each case. After winning the quarterfinal game against Sweden, they faced Australia in the semifinal. The USA team opened up as much as a 17-point lead in the fourth quarter of the game but the Australian team fought back and took a one-point lead in the final minute. Crystal Bradford scored a basket with 14 seconds left in the game to secure a 79–78 victory. The gold medal opponent was Russia, but the USA team never trailed, and won 90–71 to win the gold medal and the World University games Championship. Schimmel averaged 4.6 points per game.

Professional career
On April 14, 2014, Schimmel was selected in the first round of the 2014 WNBA draft (eighth pick overall) by the Atlanta Dream. Despite coming off the bench, Schimmel had an impressive rookie season, averaging 8.3 ppg and was voted a WNBA All-Star starter, become just the third reserve in league history to achieve that. In her first career game, Schimmel scored 7 points to go with a franchise-record 11 assists against the San Antonio Stars. In a regular season game win against the Phoenix Mercury, Schimmel scored a career-high 24 points, where she scored 20 of them in the second quarter, becoming one of six players in WNBA history to score 20 or more points in a quarter. She also earned recognition as the 2014 WNBA All-Star Game Most Valuable Player on July 19, 2014 in Phoenix, Arizona as Schimmel out battled Skylar Diggins by scoring a then WNBA All-Star Game record, 29 points (which would be broken by Maya Moore the following year). In 2014, her jersey was the league's best seller. Some of the other WNBA franchises have held events honoring Native Americans when the Dream is the visiting team. With Schimmel's productivity on the court along with a supporting cast of Sancho Lyttle, all-star center Érika de Souza and superstar small forward Angel McCoughtry, the Atlanta Dream were the number one seed in the Eastern Conference, but were upset in the first round of the playoffs, losing 2–1 to the fourth-seeded Chicago Sky.

In the 2015 season, Schimmel averaged 7.6 ppg despite starting in more games than she did in her rookie season. However, she was voted once again as a WNBA all-star starter, but the Dream never made it to the playoffs. Schimmel led the team in assists throughout the whole season.

Right before the 2016 season, Schimmel was traded to the New York Liberty in exchange for a 2017 second round draft pick. Despite being a two-time all-star, Schimmel would have a significantly reduced role on the team while averaging career lows in minutes per game (4.5 mpg) and points per game (2.1 ppg). She was also out of shape coming into training camp which ultimately led to the amount of playing time she would get. Midway through the season, Schimmel suffered a concussion that would cause her to miss the rest of the season, including the playoffs.

In May 2017, it was announced that Schimmel would be sitting out the 2017 WNBA season due to personal issues.

In April 2018, Schimmel made her return to the Liberty in training camp but would be waived a month later before the start of the 2018 WNBA season.

On May 15, 2018, Schimmel signed with the Las Vegas Aces. On May 23, 2018, Schimmel was waived by the Aces.

Personal life
Schimmel has a younger sister, Jude, who was also a teammate of hers at Louisville. Her youngest sister Milan currently plays basketball for the University of Cincinnati. She has five brothers: Shae, Mick, Saint, Job and Sun. Her parents are Ceci and Rick Schimmel. On June 15th, 2021, she was arrested for felony assault and criminal mischief.

WNBA career statistics

Regular season

|-
| style="text-align:left;"| 2014
| style="text-align:left;"| Atlanta
| 34 || 2 || 21.0|| .374 || .342 || .840 ||2.7|| 5.7 ||0.7|| 0.0 || 2.4  || 8.3
|-
| style="text-align:left;"| 2015
| style="text-align:left;"| Atlanta
| 32 || 16 || 19.8 || .378 || .383 || .857  || 2.5 || 3.2 ||0.7|| 0.1 || 2.3  || 7.6
|-
| style="text-align:left;"| 2016
| style="text-align:left;"| New York
| 17 || 0 || 4.5 || .550 || .563 || .800 || 0.5 || 0.6 ||0.1|| 0.0 || 0.4 || 2.1
|-
| style="text-align:left;"| 2018
| style="text-align:left;"| Las Vegas
| 2 || 0 || 6.4 || .000 || .000 || .000 || 1.0 || 0.5 ||0.0|| 0.0 || 0.5 || 0.0
|-
| style="text-align:left;"| Career
| style="text-align:left;"|4 years, 3 teams
| 85 || 18 || 17.0|| .379 || .366 || .845 ||1.9 || 2.8 || 0.6 || 0.1 || 2.0  || 6.6

Postseason

|-
| style="text-align:left;"| 2014
| style="text-align:left;"| Atlanta
| 3 || 3 || 19.7 || .368 || .375 || .840 || 5.7 || 3.6 || 1.0 || 0.0 || 2.3 || 6.3
|-
| style="text-align:left;"| Career
| style="text-align:left;"|1 year, 1 team
| 3 || 3 || 19.7 || .368 || .375 || .840 || 5.7 || 3.6 || 1.0 || 0.0|| 2.3 || 6.3

See also
 Ryneldi Becenti
 Angel Goodrich
 Tahnee Robinson

References

External links
Louisville bio
WNBA draft video

1992 births
Living people
All-American college women's basketball players
American women's basketball players
Atlanta Dream draft picks
Atlanta Dream players
Basketball players from Oregon
Franklin High School (Portland, Oregon) alumni
Las Vegas Aces players
Louisville Cardinals women's basketball players
Native American basketball players
New York Liberty players
Parade High School All-Americans (girls' basketball)
People from Hermiston, Oregon
Point guards
Universiade gold medalists for the United States
Universiade medalists in basketball
Women's National Basketball Association All-Stars
Medalists at the 2013 Summer Universiade
21st-century Native American women
21st-century Native Americans
Native American people from Oregon